Magnhild of Fulltofta (died before 1228), is a Danish Roman Catholic local saint. She is one of the three female saints of Scania alongside Sissela of Borrby and Tora of Torekov, but she is the only one of them documented as an actual historical person.

Magnhild was described as a pious woman from Benarp who nursed the sick, and educated and provided for children. She was murdered by her daughter-in-law with an arrow. When her corpse was brought from Fulltofta home to Benarp, the coffin-carriers rested at Hästäng. There, a well appeared where they put down her coffin. After this, a chapel was erected by the well, and Magnhild, though never canonized by the pope, became the object of veneration.

The veneration of Magnhild is first mentioned in 1228. By then it was apparently a recent phenomenon, and she reportedly lived in the early 13th-century. In 1383, her remains were moved to Lund Cathedral.

See also
 Margrethe of Roskilde

References

 Hans-Uno Bengtsson: "Trolleri med gamla ben" i Gräbbor, töser, kvingor, nådor (Skånska Akademiens årsbok 1997; Malmö 1997)

13th-century Danish people
Danish Roman Catholic saints
13th-century Christian saints
Year of birth unknown
Medieval Swedish saints
Swedish Roman Catholic saints
Medieval Danish saints
Female saints of medieval Sweden
Female saints of medieval Denmark
13th-century Danish women